Emicizumab, sold under the brand name Hemlibra, is a humanized bispecific antibody for the treatment of haemophilia A, developed by Genentech and Chugai (a subsidiary of Roche). A Phase I clinical trial found that it was well tolerated by healthy subjects.

In November 2017, it was approved in the United States for treatment of haemophilia A in those who had developed resistance to other treatments. It was subsequently approved by the US FDA in April 2018 under the breakthrough therapy designation for treatment of haemophila A in those who have not developed resistance to other treatments. The U.S. Food and Drug Administration (FDA) considers it to be a first-in-class medication.

Mechanism of action
Emicizumab binds to both the activated coagulation factor IX and to factor X, mediating the activation of the latter. This is normally the function of coagulation factor VIII, which is missing in haemophilia A patients.

References

External links 
 

Breakthrough therapy
Haemophilia
Hoffmann-La Roche brands
Genentech brands
Monoclonal antibodies